Ellinor Vanderveer (August 5, 1886 – May 27, 1976), was an American actress who usually played dowagers, high class society matrons or party guests. She appeared in 111 films between 1924 and 1953, including several Laurel and Hardy comedies and two films from early in the American career of British-born James Whale. She was born in New York City and died in Loma Linda, California.

Selected filmography

External links

1886 births
1976 deaths
American film actresses
American silent film actresses
20th-century American actresses